Whitehaven was a constituency centred on the town of Whitehaven in Cumberland, which returned one Member of Parliament (MP)  to the House of Commons of the Parliament of the United Kingdom.

It was created in 1832 and renamed Copeland at the 1983 general election.

Boundaries 
The boundaries were unaffected in 1885, under the second Great Reform agreed the previous year, its key limb of The Redistribution of Seats Act 1885 not yet absorbing the bulk of the area of Egremont or 'the Western Division of Cumberland'.  The latter mainly rural area, much larger than Whitehaven borough which formed the existing seat, was added to the seat under the Representation of the People Act 1918.

Members of Parliament

Elections

Elections in the 1830s

Elections in the 1840s

Elections in the 1850s

Hildyard's death caused a by-election.

Elections in the 1860s

Elections in the 1870s

Cavendish-Bentinck was appointed Judge Advocate General of the Armed Forces, causing a by-election.

Elections in the 1880s

Elections in the 1890s
Cavendish-Bentinck's death caused a by-election.

Elections in the 1900s

Elections in the 1910s

Elections in the 1920s

Elections in the 1930s

Election in the 1940s

Elections in the 1950s

Elections in the 1960s

Elections in the 1970s

Sources

References 

Parliamentary constituencies in North West England (historic)
Constituencies of the Parliament of the United Kingdom established in 1832
Constituencies of the Parliament of the United Kingdom disestablished in 1983
Politics of Cumbria
Whitehaven